Extradition in the Philippines may come into effect when the Philippine government and a foreign government sign an agreement through a treaty to be ratified by both parties.

Countries

Extradition in force
These are countries that have signed extradition treaties to the Philippines and have taken effect by ratification:

Extradition in planning
As of 2014, the Philippines has proposed or pending extradition negotiations with Austria, Belgium, Brazil, France, Iran, Israel, Jamaica, Peru, Saudi Arabia, United Arab Emirates, Venezuela and Vietnam.

See also
Extradition law in the United States
Extradition law in Australia
Department of Foreign Affairs (Philippines)

External links
A Database of Philippine treaties

References

Philippines
Law of the Philippines
Foreign relations of the Philippines